The 1998 William Hill Greyhound Derby took place during May and June with the final being held on 27 June 1998 at Wimbledon Stadium. The winner Toms The Best received £50,000. The competition was sponsored by William Hill following the demise of the famous Sporting Life newspaper. Ante-post favourite Larkhill Jo was eliminated in the third round. The heats were held on 26, 29 & 30 May, the second round on 2, 5 & 6 June, third round on 13 June, quarter finals on 16 June and semi finals on 20 June.

Final result 
At Wimbledon (over 480 metres):

Distances 
4¼, 4¾, short head, 1 (lengths)
The distances between the greyhounds are in finishing order and shown in lengths. One length is equal to 0.08 of one second.

Race Report
Toms The Best added the English Derby crown to his 1997 Irish Greyhound Derby success becoming one of a very select group to have won both the English and Irish Derby. The race was won with relative ease by the hot favourite in a crowded race which featured only five greyhounds (the first time since 1970) after Greenwood Flyer was disqualified by the stewards in the semi-finals for fighting*.

Semi finals

 * Deliberate interference with other greyhounds in running.

See also
1998 UK & Ireland Greyhound Racing Year

References

Greyhound Derby
English Greyhound Derby